Karolina Karlsson (born 27 May 1966) is a Swedish former professional tennis player.

Biography
A right-handed player from Vingåker, Karlsson represented the Sweden Federation Cup team in a 1985 tie against South Korea, partnering Carina Karlsson in the doubles rubber.

Karlsson reached a best singles ranking of 136 in the world, with her best WTA Tour performance a quarter-final appearance at the Swedish Open Båstad in 1987, beating sixth seed Patricia Tarabini en route.

At the 1987 French Open she featured in the main draw as a lucky loser and lost her first round match in three sets to Italian qualifier Linda Ferrando.

See also
List of Sweden Fed Cup team representatives

References

External links
 
 
 

1966 births
Living people
Swedish female tennis players
People from Vingåker Municipality
Sportspeople from Södermanland County
20th-century Swedish women
21st-century Swedish women